Edward Żentara (18 March 1956 – 25 May 2011) was a Polish actor. He appeared in more than 50 films and television shows between 1978 and 2010. His son Mikołaj is the founder of Polish black metal band Mgła.

Selected filmography

 Austeria (1982) - Hasid
 Byl jazz (1983)
 Karate po polsku (1983) - Piotr
 Wedle wyroków twoich... (1984)
 Marynia (1984)
 Coronel Redl (1985) - Hauptmann Salapska
 Sam posród swoich (1985) - Merchant Polsner
 C.K. dezerterzy (1986) - Lieutenant
 Zygfryd (1986) - Stanislaw
 Axiliad (1986) - Janek Pradera
 Aniol w szafie (1987) - Film Director
 Luk Erosa (1987) - Zatorski
 Opowiesc Harleya (1988) - Marek
 Bez grzechu (1988) - Jan Jezierski, Marta's Brother
 Hard to Be a God (1989) - Rumata / Anton
 Triumph of the Spirit (1989) - Janush
 ¡Ay Carmela! (1990) - Soldado polaco
  (1991) - Maximilian Kolbe
 Przekleta Ameryka (1993) - Zbyszek Butryn
 Piekna nieznajoma (1993) - The Spy Chief
 Enak (1993) - Charles Enak
 Pestka (1995) - Priest in Borys' Workshop
 Pokuszenie (1995) - Parson
 Germans (1996) - Tourterelle
 Watroba i Ziemniaki (1998) - Kain
 Zloto dezerterów (1998) - Tank soldier
 The Hexer (2002, TV Mini-Series) - King Foltest
 Show (2003) - Politician
 Nie ma takiego numeru (2007)
 Czarny (2008) - Priest Jan
 Trick (2010) - Vice prime minister

References

External links

1956 births
2011 deaths
Polish male film actors
Polish male stage actors
Polish male television actors
20th-century Polish male actors
21st-century Polish male actors
People from Koszalin County
2011 suicides
Suicides in Poland